The term Atlantic Division may refer to:

 Atlantic Branch, a railway
 Atlantic Division (NBA), the division by this name in the NBA
 Atlantic Division (NHL), the current division by this name in the NHL
 
 One of the two divisions in the Atlantic Coast Conference